Alex Davis (born 3 October 1992) is an English rugby union player. He has represented the England national rugby sevens team.

Early and personal life
Davis was born in Gloucester, grew up in Bristol and he attended Queen Elizabeth's Hospital school in Clifton where he was also a keen cricketer. He went back and coached rugby at his old school during the Covid-19 pandemic He later attended Loughborough University.

Rugby career
Davis was selected for the England national rugby sevens team  for the 2016 Olympics in Brazil but was ruled out from appearing through injury. Two years later he was part England squad that won bronze at the 2018 Commonwealth Games in Australia, and was then also part of the team that won silver at the 2018 Rugby World Cup Sevens in San Francisco. He was named captain of the England squad for the 2022 Rugby World Cup Sevens held in Cape Town, South Africa in September 2022.

References

1992 births
Living people
England international rugby sevens players
English rugby union players
Rugby sevens players at the 2020 Summer Olympics
Olympic rugby sevens players of Great Britain
Commonwealth Games medallists in rugby sevens
Commonwealth Games bronze medallists for England
Rugby sevens players at the 2018 Commonwealth Games
Rugby union players from Gloucester
Medallists at the 2018 Commonwealth Games